Cam Plante (born March 12, 1964) is a Canadian former professional ice hockey defenceman.  He was drafted in the seventh round, 128th overall, by the Toronto Maple Leafs in the 1983 NHL Entry Draft.  He played two games in the National Hockey League with the Maple Leafs in the 1984–85 season.

Plante holds the Western Hockey League record for points in a season by a defenceman.  He scored 140 points as a member of the Brandon Wheat Kings in the 1983–84 WHL season.

He finished his playing career with the Wichita Thunder of the CHL, having returned to North America following four seasons on the United Kingdom. Most of that time was spent with the Peterborough Pirates, but also encompassed short spells with the Chelmsford Chieftains and Humberside Hawks.

He is the father of former Florida Panthers prospect Tyler Plante and former Edmonton Oilers prospect Alex Plante.

Career statistics

Regular season and playoffs

Awards
 WHL East First All-Star Team – 1984

External links

1964 births
Brandon Wheat Kings players
Canadian expatriate ice hockey players in Austria
Canadian expatriate ice hockey players in Switzerland
Canadian ice hockey defencemen
Denver Daredevils players
EC VSV players
Fort Wayne Komets players
HC Davos players
Ice hockey people from Manitoba
Sportspeople from Brandon, Manitoba
Kansas City Blades players
Living people
Milwaukee Admirals (IHL) players
Newmarket Saints players
St. Catharines Saints players
St. Louis Vipers players
Thunder Bay Thunder Hawks players
Toronto Maple Leafs draft picks
Toronto Maple Leafs players
Wichita Thunder players
Canadian expatriate ice hockey players in Germany
Canadian expatriate ice hockey players in England